Ōtorohanga is a north King Country town in the Waikato region in the North Island of New Zealand. It is a service town for the surrounding dairy-farming district. It is recognised as the "gateway" to the Waitomo Caves and as the "Kiwiana Town" of New Zealand. Until 2007, Ōtorohanga held a yearly 'Kiwiana Festival.'

History

Early history

Until the 1860s Ōtorohanga was a Ngāti Maniapoto village, with several whare (houses), peach trees and a flour mill. Huipūtea is a 300-year-old kahikatea tree, just to the south east of Ōtorohanga, which was the site of a skirmish in 1822 between Ngāti Maniapoto and Ngāpuhi. The village was abandoned after the invasion of the Waikato, except for Lewis Hettit's (or Hetet) farm. The area remained insecure, with Hettit's store being robbed by Te Kooti in 1869, but a meeting with Donald McLean later that year signalled moves towards peace.

John William Ellis became postmaster and opened a store in 1885 with Henry Valder and John Taonui Hetet. In 1886 Ngāti Maniopoto built a court room for the Native Land Court and from that year mail was delivered 3 times a month and disputes which had delayed development were settled. On 9 March 1887 the railway was extended  from Te Awamutu and a 14-room hotel was built, primarily for those attending the Court. The sawmill, later run by Ellis and Burnand, started in 1890 and closed in 1912.

Modern history

In the early 1900s many businesses were established by Māori, in particular John Ormsby (Hōne Ōmipi). The Otorohanga Times was formed in 1912; it merged with the King Country Chronicle to form the Waitomo News in 1980. McDonald’s began a limestone quarry south of Otorohanga in 1968, which was bought by Graymont in 2015.

Otorohanga’s population grew from 367 in 1916 to 1,569 in 1951, after which growth slowed. Although population dropped from 2,652 in 1991 and to 2,514 in 2013, the fall was much less than in the rest of King Country.

Harrodsville

In 1986, the town briefly changed its name to "Harrodsville". This was a protest in support of a restaurateur, Henry Harrod of Palmerston North, who was being forced to change the name of his restaurant following the threat of lawsuits from Mohamed Al-Fayed, the then owner of Harrod's department store in London.

As a show of solidarity for Henry Harrod, and in anticipation of actions against other similar-sounding businesses, it was proposed that every business in Otorohanga change its name to "Harrods".  With the support of the District Council, Otorohanga temporarily changed the town's name to Harrodsville.

After being lampooned in the British tabloids, Al Fayed dropped the legal action and Harrodsville and its shops reverted to their former names. The town's response raised widespread media interest around the world, with the BBC World Service and newspapers in Greece, Saudi Arabia, Australia and Canada covering the story.

Floods 
Ōtorohanga is built on the Waipā's flood plain, but is largely protected by stop banks built between 1961 and 1966, following a major flood in 1958. In 1907 the whole town was flooded. Houses were also flooded in 1893 and 1926.

Local government 
Ōtorohanga is part of the Ōtorohanga District, which stretches from Kawhia Harbour on the west coast inland to the Pureora Forest Park. The town is the largest in the District and the seat of the District Council.

Demographics

Ōtorohanga had a population of 3,027 at the 2018 New Zealand census, an increase of 402 people (15.3%) since the 2013 census, and an increase of 372 people (14.0%) since the 2006 census. There were 1,101 households, comprising 1,464 males and 1,563 females, giving a sex ratio of 0.94 males per female. The median age was 37.6 years (compared with 37.4 years nationally), with 636 people (21.0%) aged under 15 years, 615 (20.3%) aged 15 to 29, 1,185 (39.1%) aged 30 to 64, and 591 (19.5%) aged 65 or older.

Ethnicities were 67.6% European/Pākehā, 40.6% Māori, 2.7% Pacific peoples, 5.6% Asian, and 1.4% other ethnicities. People may identify with more than one ethnicity.

The percentage of people born overseas was 11.3, compared with 27.1% nationally.

Although some people chose not to answer the census's question about religious affiliation, 51.6% had no religion, 32.3% were Christian, 3.2% had Māori religious beliefs, 1.7% were Hindu, 0.1% were Muslim, 1.1% were Buddhist and 2.3% had other religions.

Of those at least 15 years old, 255 (10.7%) people had a bachelor's or higher degree, and 675 (28.2%) people had no formal qualifications. The median income was $26,700, compared with $31,800 nationally. 192 people (8.0%) earned over $70,000 compared to 17.2% nationally. The employment status of those at least 15 was that 1,137 (47.6%) people were employed full-time, 363 (15.2%) were part-time, and 87 (3.6%) were unemployed.

Marae

Six marae are located in and around Ōtorohanga:
 Kahotea Marae and Whatihua meeting house is a meeting place for the Ngāti Maniapoto hapū of Apakura, Hinetū, Ngāti Matakore and Pare te Kawa, and the Waikato Tainui hapū of Apakura.
 Rereamanu Marae and Te Kawau Kaki Maro meeting house is a meeting place for the Maniapoto hapū of Huiao and Te Kanawa.
 Tārewānga Marae and Te Rau a te Moa meeting house is a meeting place for the Maniapoto hapū of Pare te Kawa, Rungaterangi, Urunumia and Tārewānga.
 Te Keeti Marae and Parewaeono meeting house is a meeting place of the Maniapoto hapū of Ngutu, Parewaeono and Urunumia.
 Te Kotahitanga Marae and Te Kotahitanga meeting house is a meeting place for the Maniapoto hapū of Pourahi and Urunumia.
 Turitea Marae and Turitea meeting house is a meeting place for the Maniapoto hapū of Pourahui.

Attractions
Ōtorohanga is internationally renowned for its Kiwi House, which was the first place in the world where the general public could view kiwi in captivity, and recorded an average of 5,000 visitors per month .  The town has a public library, a swimming complex, a supermarket and a 24-hour McDonald's restaurant.

Transport
Ōtorohanga is on the North Island Main Trunk railway line. Otorohanga railway station opened in 1887. The Northern Explorer passenger train stopped in Ōtorohanga until 2021.

Education
Ōtorohanga School is a Year 1–8 co-educational state primary school.

Ōtorohanga South School is a Year 1–8 co-educational state primary school.

St Mary's Catholic School is a Year 1–8 co-educational state integrated Catholic primary school.

Ōtorohanga College is a Year 9–13 co-educational state secondary school and community education centre.

References

External links
 The district council's official website
 The Otorohanga Community official website
 Long Term Council Community Plan 2006-2016
Photo of 2004 flooding of school and houses

Ōtorohanga District
Territorial authorities of New Zealand
Populated places in Waikato